The 1952-53 Scottish National League season was the 15th and penultimate season of the Scottish National League, the top level of ice hockey in Scotland at the time. Eight teams participated in the league, and the Falkirk Lions won the championship.

Regular season

References

Scot
ice hockey
ice hockey